Bruce Whyte MacPherson MLC (18 January 1891 - 31 October 1971) was a Second Deemster in the Isle of Man.

MacPherson was born in Liverpool in 1891 and became a Captain in 4 Battalion, King's Liverpool Regiment and served in the Cameroons, 1914–15. He was promoted to Major in 1935.  As an advocate he joined the Manx Bar in 1936. He was Second Deemster and a member of the Legislative Council 1958 to 1963.  He was the last Second Deemster to sit in the Legislative Council ex officio before the 1965 Act removed the right.

The following was said about his capacity as a Judge:

MacPherson was also a leading authority on genealogy and heraldry. He was also Vice President of the Royal British Legion and Captain of the Parish of Santon from 1964.

1891 births
1971 deaths
Manx judges